Emmanuel Ndahiro is a Rwandan soldier. He was the chief of the intelligence agency of Rwanda until 2011.

References

Living people
Rwandan generals
Year of birth missing (living people)
People named in the Panama Papers